Galil Ben Shanan  is a former Israeli football goalkeeper.

International League Records 

Hapoel Tel Aviv

External links
UEFA profile 
SKY profile 

1982 births
Living people
Israeli footballers
Hapoel Tel Aviv F.C. players
Maccabi Ramat Amidar F.C. players
Hapoel Marmorek F.C. players
Hapoel Haifa F.C. players
Hapoel Be'er Sheva F.C. players
Maccabi Be'er Sheva F.C. players
Hapoel Ashkelon F.C. players
Maccabi Yavne F.C. players
Association football goalkeepers
Israeli Premier League players
Liga Leumit players
Israeli people of Moroccan-Jewish descent
Footballers from Holon